Ab Barik (also Romanized as Āb Bārīk, Āb-e Bārīk, and Āb-ī-Bārīk) is a village in Razan Rural District, in the Central District of Razan County, Hamadan Province, Iran. At the 2006 census, its population was 904, in 216 families.

References 

Populated places in Razan County